Fuka Tsunoda (born 24 October 2004) is a Japanese professional footballer who plays as a midfielder for WE League club Urawa Reds.

Club career 
Tsunoda made her WE League debut on 31 October 2021.

References 

Japanese women's footballers
Living people
2004 births
Women's association football midfielders
Urawa Red Diamonds Ladies players
WE League players